The Clarendon-Linden fault system is a major series of fault lines in western New York state, in the United States. It extends through Orleans, Genesee,  Wyoming, and into Allegany counties and is responsible for much of the seismic activity in the region.

The system is named in part for the town of Clarendon, New York.

References
University at Buffalo, Dept of Geology Sedimentology and Stratigraphy.

Seismic faults of the United States
Geology of New York (state)